The following is a list of professional wrestling attendance records in the United Kingdom. The list is dominated by the American professional wrestling promotion World Wrestling Entertainment which has controlled the industry in North America since 2002. As the World Wrestling Federation, it became the first national promotion in the U.S. during the 1980s wrestling boom. World Championship Wrestling, the main competitor to the WWF during the 1990s wrestling boom, also set several records during their visits. However, all of their events were surpassed by the WWE in the early 2000s.

In its heyday, British-based Joint Promotions and its independent rivals generally relied on intensive touring rather than major individual shows - by the mid 1960s Joint had an annual touring schedule of between 4000 and 5000 house shows including weekly residencies in over thirty cities.  However, Joint regularly appeared at the Royal Albert Hall in London and organised three major shows at Wembley Arena between 1979 and 1981 at the height of top star Big Daddy's popularity.  Both venues would later host WWF and WCW shows.  

The mainstream popularity of British wrestling largely declined after the cancellation of ITV's World of Sport in 1985 and then the standalone Wrestling programme on the network in 1988. (A programme continued on regional Welsh language terrestrial channel S4C until 1995.) Joint Promotions closed down in February 1995, although rival All Star Wrestling, which supplanted Joint as dominant local promotion in the late 1980s after taking over a share of the final two years of ITV coverage, survives at grassroots level to this day. 

As a result, all of the attendance records formerly set by British wrestling promotions were gradually surpassed in the years following the WWF's arrival in the UK. The WWF's official UK debut took place on October 10, 1989, at the sold-out London Arena in London, England. The main event was a match between Hulk Hogan (with Miss Elizabeth) and Randy Savage (with Sensational Sherri) for the WWF World Heavyweight Championship. The event was broadcast live on Sky One. A similar show was held the next night in Birmingham. 

This was followed by a series of high profile UK tours, starting with the 1991 UK Rampage. By August 1992 this had culimated in the WWF holding Summerslam '92 at Wembley Stadium before nearly 80,000 fans - a live event on a scale precedented within the worldwide wrestling industry only by 1987's Wrestlemania III. WCW meanwhile, with WCW Worldwide in a graveyard slot on ITV, conducted an exploratory tour in December 1991. Fuller tours were conducted in 1993-1994 by which time ITV had moved WCW to British wrestling's old Saturday afternoon timeslot. These ceased once the company moved to pan-European satellite channel Superchannel in late 1995 but resumed after the move back to terrestrial television on Channel 5 in 1999, with two more tours in 2000 before the company closed in 2001.

A series of live and PPV events, Mayhem in Manchester (1998), No Mercy (1999), Rebellion (1999-2002), Insurrextion (2000-2003), were created exclusively for the British market. WWE ended all-UK exclusive pay-per-views when its weekly programming began broadcasting on British television in 2004. According to this list, 13 events are from WWE's flagship television show WWE Raw and 5 from WWE Smackdown, which since 2005's has been held exclusively in stadiums that typically have a seating capacity of at least 20,000 people or more. Only one of the attendances listed is a non-WWE event, a house show during WCW Nitro U.K. Tour 2000! which is the last remaining record set by the company. All of these events have been held in England, most often in either Manchester or the capital city of London. On November 15, 2015, an Insane Championship Wrestling show in Glasgow, Scotland, headlined by Grado vs. Drew Galloway, drew a sellout crowd of 3,802 fans and a $152,780 gate. It was the biggest crowd for a British-based promotion since 1982 and the largest UK gate of the "modern-era".

Events and attendances

Historical

See also

List of professional wrestling attendance records
List of professional wrestling attendance records in Europe
List of professional wrestling attendance records in Japan
List of professional wrestling attendance records in Puerto Rico
List of WWE attendance records
List of professional wrestling attendance records in Oceania

Footnotes

References

External links
Supercards & Tournaments: United Kingdom
Wrestling attendance records in the United Kingdom at Wrestlingdata.com

U
Attendance records
Professional wrestling in the United Kingdom
professional wrestling attendance records